Fuck Everyone and Run (F E A R) is the eighteenth studio album by the British neo-progressive rock band Marillion, released in 2016.

Production
As with many of their recent recordings, Marillion, who are widely considered crowdfunding pioneers, turned to their fans to finance the new album. This time the group decided to join the online direct-to-fan music platform PledgeMusic in order to expand their management and customer service possibilities. The pre-order campaign was launched on 1 September 2015 and by 6 October fans from 67 countries pledged to buy the album. The money received enabled Marillion to tour across South America in May 2016 and North America in October 2016. The album was recorded between 2014 and 2016 at the group's own Racket Club Studios in Buckinghamshire, as well as at Peter Gabriel's Real World Studios in Wiltshire, where Marillion spent a week in the end of the winter in 2016. On 7 April 2016, the band revealed the cover art and announced the album title as Fuck Everyone and Run (F E A R). 
Singer Steve Hogarth commented on the title, saying,

Release
On 7 July, customers of the PledgeMusic campaign received access to download the song suite The New Kings, and an edited version of the song was made available to the public on Marillion's YouTube channel.

The campaign offered various options of pre-ordering the album—called only by the code name M18 at that time—including CD, download only, and a limited Ultimate Edition box, containing, among others, a Blu-ray Disc containing a making-of-the-album film. Originally the album was slated to be released on 1 May 2016, but was later postponed to 9 September, and again to 23 September. Fuck Everyone and Run (F E A R) was released as a standard CD, a multi-channel Super Audio CD, and also as a 33⅓ rpm double-vinyl LP with a slightly different track order. A special limited golden vinyl version of the album was released for Record Store Day 2017 on 22 April.

The album peaked at #4 in the UK, marking the band's highest chart position since Clutching at Straws in 1987.

Track listing

2xLP edition

 Side one
 "El Dorado"
 Side two
 "Living in F E A R"
 "White Paper"

 Side three
"The Leavers"
 Side four
 "The New Kings"
 "Tomorrow's New Country"

Personnel

Marillion
 Steve Hogarth – lead vocals, hammered dulcimer (on "The New Kings"), bass xylophone (on "The Leavers")
 Steve Rothery – guitar, additional fretless bass on "White Paper"
 Pete Trewavas – bass, additional vocals
 Mark Kelly – keyboards
 Ian Mosley – drums

Additional musicians
 Sofi Hogarth – additional vocals on "El Dorado", "The Leavers", and "The New Kings"
 Jennie Rothery – additional vocals on "The Leavers"
 Eleanor Gilchrist – violin
 Geraldine Berreen – violin
 Teresa Whipple – viola
 Abigail Trundle – cello

Technical personnel
 Michael Hunter – producer, mixing engineer
 Simon Ward – artwork, design

Charts

References

Marillion albums
2016 albums